Clifford Longley is an English journalist and author.

Early life
Clifford Longley was educated at the Trinity School of John Whitgift in Croydon. He graduated from the University of Southampton.

Career
Longley was a journalist for The Times from 1967 to 1992. He was a columnist for The Daily Telegraph from 1992 to 2000. He is a columnist and contributing editor for The Tablet, a Roman Catholic magazine.

Longley is the author of several books. He has advised the Catholic Bishops' Conference of England and Wales.

Works

References

Living people
People educated at Trinity School of John Whitgift
Alumni of the University of Southampton
English journalists
English columnists
English Roman Catholic writers
Year of birth missing (living people)